Fred Claire (born October 5, 1935) is a former major league baseball executive who served in numerous roles for the Los Angeles Dodgers from 1969–1998 including the role of general manager from 1987 to 1998.

Early life
Claire was born on October 5, 1935 in Jamestown, Ohio.  His father owned and operated a drugstore.  Claire has one brother and a sister.  In 1950, Marston and Mary Francis Claire moved their family to Torrance, CA, a suburb of Los Angeles.  Fred graduated from Torrance High School, then obtained his bachelor's degree in journalism from San Jose State University. He holds an Associate of Arts degree from Mt. San Antonio College and has been honored by the college as an outstanding alumnus. He also attended El Camino College, located in Torrance.  While at El Camino, he had a paper published in Baseball Magazine called "Make Way for the Coast League" which discussed baseball on the west coast and turning the Pacific Coast League into a Major League.

Throughout the late 1950s and 1960s, Claire worked as a sports editor/sports writer for the Whittier Daily News, the Pomona Progress-Bulletin, and the Long Beach Independent Press-Telegram. He married and had three children, Jen, Jeff, and Kim.

Dodgers Public Relations executive
In the spring of 1969, Fred was assigned to cover the Dodgers during spring training in Vero Beach, FL for the Press-Telegram.  During the season, one of the assistants in the public relations department for the Dodgers was fired.  Claire expressed his interest in the position to Dodger executives and was hired in July 1969.  He worked in that same position until 1975 when his boss, Dodgers vice president of public relations, Red Patterson, left to work for the California Angels. Claire moved into Patterson's position.  During his time as VP of Public Relations, he was instrumental in creating the branding that came to be known as "Dodger blue" and the subsequent "Think Blue" campaign and also the hiring of announcer Ross Porter.  Porter would remain a Dodger announcer from 1977 until 2004.

Dodgers general manager
On April 6, 1987, Dodgers General Manager Al Campanis accepted the offer to appear on the Nightline television show to talk about his thoughts on the 40th anniversary of Jackie Robinson breaking the color barrier.  Campanis did not alert anyone in the Dodgers organization that he would be on the show.  When Campanis was asked why he felt there were not African American baseball managers, he stated, "I truly believe they may not have some of the necessities to be, let's say, a field manager, or perhaps, a general manager.  Why are black people not good swimmers? Because they don't have buoyancy."  These comments stunned the baseball world.  Campanis, who did not have a reputation as a racist and was one of the few Dodger players to welcome Robinson during his debut, was forced to resign his post with the Dodgers with Claire assuming player personnel responsibilities.

Dodgers president Peter O'Malley moved Claire into the general manager position.  After a dismal 1987 season, Claire rebuilt the team into an instant playoff contender.  During the offseason before the 1988 season, Claire acquired veteran outfielders Kirk Gibson and Mike Davis, veteran shortstop Alfredo Griffin, and pitchers Jay Howell and Jesse Orosco.  The Dodgers would go on to win the 1988 World Series against the heavily favored Oakland Athletics in just five games.

His later moves were not as successful. On November 8, 1990 the Dodgers gave free agent outfielder Darryl Strawberry a five-year contract worth $20 million.  At the time it looked like a good deal.  Strawberry hit 37 home runs with a .277 batting average in 1989 for the New York Mets.  However, Strawberry's time with the Dodgers was characterized by chronic back problems, drug abuse and overall underachievement. 

The following year, on November 27, 1991, Claire traded pitchers Tim Belcher and John Wetteland to the Cincinnati Reds for outfielder Eric Davis and pitcher Kip Gross.  It was supposed to set up a  reunion of childhood friends Strawberry and Davis.  However, Davis was also plagued by injuries throughout his less than 2-year stint with the Dodgers.  He was traded to the Detroit Tigers in August 1993.  Wetteland, was traded from the Reds to the Montreal Expos less than a month after he had joined the Reds.  Wetteland went on to become one of the most dominating relief pitchers in the MLB throughout the rest of the 1990s. Darryl Strawberry was given his outright release on May 26, 1994 after he failed to show up to a game.

The transaction even Claire would later regret occurred in 1994.  In need of a second baseman after a contract dispute with Jody Reed, Claire sent the talented Pedro Martínez to Montreal for Delino DeShields.  Martinez became one of the best pitchers in the MLB for the next decade and a half.  Martinez was selected to 8 All Star teams and won the Cy Young Award in 1997, 1999 and 2000 and, eventually, was inducted into the National Baseball Hall of Fame.  Deshields spent three years as the Dodgers starting second baseman in which he was more known for his various injuries and numerous complaints that the Dodgers did not have enough black players on the team.

FOX takeover/Claire's removal
Claire continued as the Dodger general manager through the 1997 season.  When Rupert Murdoch's News Corporation, owner of the Fox network and 20th Century Fox purchased the team in 1998, officials stated that Claire and Field Manager Bill Russell would remain in their positions. On May 15, 1998, new Dodger officials made a blockbuster trade without the involvement or knowledge of General Manager Claire, a move that was unheard of in baseball at the time. The trade was one of the biggest in Dodger history.  The Dodgers traded Mike Piazza and Todd Zeile to the Florida Marlins for Gary Sheffield, Charles Johnson, Jim Eisenreich and Bobby Bonilla. Claire was furious that the new FOX officials would make such a deal as Piazza had been with the organization for over a decade and Zeile had signed for less than market value to be closer to his home in suburban Santa Clarita, CA. Claire, who had full control of player transactions before FOX took over, pulled no punches when he was asked his feeling on the trade. On June 21, 1998 Claire and Russell were both relieved of their duties in what was deemed by those in baseball as the "Sunday Night Massacre." Russell was replaced by Glenn Hoffman, Claire by Tom Lasorda.

References

See also

1935 births
Living people
Los Angeles Dodgers executives
Major League Baseball general managers
People from Jamestown, Ohio
El Camino College alumni
Baseball writers
American sportswriters